Mehnagar is a constituency of the Uttar Pradesh Legislative Assembly covering the city of Mehnagar in the Azamgarh district of Uttar Pradesh, India.

Mehnagar is one of five assembly constituencies in the Azamgarh Lok Sabha constituency. Since 2008, this assembly constituency is numbered 352 amongst 403 constituencies.

Election results

2022

2017
Samajwadi Party candidate Kalpnath Paswan won in last Assembly election of 2017 Uttar Pradesh Legislative Elections defeating Suheldev Bharatiya Samaj Party candidate Manjoo Saroj by a margin of 5,412 votes.

Members of Legislative Assembly

References

External links
 

Assembly constituencies of Uttar Pradesh
Politics of Azamgarh district